Vasiliades is a surname. Notable people with the surname include:

Constantine Vasiliades (born 1985), Cypriot weightlifter
William Vasiliades (born 1987), Cypriot weightlifter

See also
Vasiliadis